Stornoway black pudding is a type of black pudding made in the Western Isles of Scotland.

Characteristics 
Jeremy Lee described it as "... arguably the best sausage made in the UK"
and tourist website Information-Britain.co.uk website as "one of the finest blood puddings the world has to offer".

The application Protected Geographical Indicator of Origin (PGI) status describes the puddings as follows:

Application for PGI status 
The application for PGI status came about after the food was threatened by "impostor puddings" labelled as Stornoway but made outside of the Western Isles. The application was made in January 2009, and protected status was granted in May 2013.

The Scottish Government's application to the European Union specified two key characteristics:

 Geographical origin – it is made "on the Isle of Lewis and the surrounding 'Stornoway Trust' area".
 Recipe – its ingredients (principally beef suet, oatmeal, onion, and blood) are within the tolerance of certain specified proportions.

See also 

 List of sausages

References

External links 
 Help keep Stornoway Black Pudding real (Stornoway Gazette)

Scottish sausages
Scottish cuisine
Stornoway
Savory puddings
Blood sausages